Maksim Vladimirovich Andreyev (born 19 January 1988) is a Russian professional football player who plays for Zvezda Saint Petersburg.

Club career

Torpedo Moscow
He made his Russian Football National League debut for FC Torpedo Moscow on 16 April 2008 in a game against FC Metallurg-Kuzbass Novokuznetsk.

Salyut Belgorod
On 30 October 2013, Andreev scored the only goal in Russian Cup match vs Dynamo Moscow to book his team place in the last 16 stage of the competition.

Dynamo Saint Petersburg
On 13 February 2014, Dynamo St.Petersburg announced signing Andreyev on permanent basis.

Anzhi Makhachkala
On 29 December 2014, Andreyev signed a six-month contract with FC Anzhi Makhachkala, with the option of extending the contract for another year.

References

External links
 
 
 

1988 births
Footballers from Saint Petersburg
Living people
Russian footballers
Russia youth international footballers
Association football midfielders
Russian expatriate footballers
Expatriate footballers in Belarus
Expatriate footballers in Latvia
FC Zenit-2 Saint Petersburg players
FC Torpedo Moscow players
FC Petrotrest players
FC Vityaz Podolsk players
FC Dynamo Saint Petersburg players
FC Salyut Belgorod players
FC Anzhi Makhachkala players
FC Sokol Saratov players
FC Sibir Novosibirsk players
FC Gomel players
FC Tom Tomsk players